Clermont is an unincorporated community located within Mount Holly in Burlington County, New Jersey, United States. It is located on the west side of the township along Washington Street (County Route 537) and contains numerous small houses and churches arranged in a small street grid.

References

Mount Holly, New Jersey
Unincorporated communities in Burlington County, New Jersey
Unincorporated communities in New Jersey